Radio Norfolk (callsign: VL2NI) is one of three radio stations servicing Norfolk Island. Radio Norfolk is the government-owned and run radio station. The island’s other two local stations are 87.6 FM Norfolk Island owned by the Bounty Museum and the community radio station 99.9 Pines FM

History
Radio broadcasting began as a means of announcing incoming aircraft during World War II. During the 1960s and 1970s, the station provided primarily shipping and aircraft news.

In the early days of radio on Norfolk Island, the station was situated in the administration buildings in Kingston, inside what was then the new military barracks (now the office of the Norfolk Island Administrator). The station's studios were damaged by fire in the 1970s and since then, Radio Norfolk has been housed in its current premises in New Cascade Road, close to Burnt Pine.

In 1999, Radio Norfolk installed a 10-metre satellite dish to continue to receive and relay overseas TV and radio services on their own dedicated frequencies and re-transmitting other services overnight while the local station is closed.

In 1991, the Norfolk Island Broadcasting Service (which includes both television and radio services on Norfolk Island) became an additional full member of the Asia-Pacific Broadcasting Union.

References

External links
The Norfolk Island Government

 

Communications in Norfolk Island
Radio stations in Australia
Public radio in Australia